This is a list of electoral results for the Electoral district of Mooroolbark in Victorian state elections.

Members for Mooroolbark

Election results

Elections in the 1990s

References

Victoria (Australia) state electoral results by district